The Center for Khmer Studies (CKS) is a private American Overseas Research Center working to promote research, teaching and public service in the social sciences, arts and humanities, as they are related to Cambodia and the Mekong region.  CKS also aims to connect Cambodian scholars, students and artists with their international colleagues for the purposes of fostering understanding of Cambodia and Southeast Asia.

History 
CKS was founded in 1999 as an international non-governmental organization by a consortium of universities, organizations, scholars and individuals. Initially, CKS programs were developed in priority fields for Cambodians, like architecture, anthropology and archaeology.  CKS has since taken a new approach to its research and training activities in recent years, collaborating directly with Cambodian and overseas universities.

Programs 
CKS works to encourages foreign scholars working in Cambodian to collaborate with local scholars in order to develop the human resources of Cambodians and allow for the transfer of knowledge and expertise among Cambodian scholars and their international counterparts. Additionally, CKS offers a fellowship program, research and training programs, publishing and translation programs, and hosts a variety of conferences, lectures and workshops.

CKS's three core objectives are to:

•	Facilitate research and international scholarly exchange through programs that increase understanding of Cambodia and its region;
•	Help strengthen Cambodia's cultural and academic structures and integrate Cambodian scholars into their regional and international community;
•	Promote a vigorous Cambodian civil society.

Due to the lack of access to books and educational resources through libraries in most of Cambodia, CKS started building a library collection in 2001, specializing in Cambodian and Southeast Asian history and culture with over 18,500 volumes to date. An addition to the library was opened in January 2010 under the patronage of His Majesty King Norodom Sihamoni.

Partnerships 
CKS is the only Southeast Asian member of the Council of American Overseas Research Centers.
The Consortium of the CKS is a membership based network of committed institutions and individuals that include universities, libraries, academic societies and museums.  Some of the Consortium of the CKS’s numerous international partners and affiliates include: Association for Asian American Studies, Asian Cultural Council, Cornell University, Paris Institute of Political Studies, New York University, Smithsonian Institution, UCLA and the University of Chicago.

CKS receives its funding through foundation grants, corporate support and generous private individuals and groups.

Governance 
CKS is led by its board of directors:

 Lois de Menil, Ph.D., President
 Anne H. Bass, Vice President
 Olivier Bernier, Vie President
 Dean Berry, Esq., Secretary and General Counsel
 Gaye Fugate, Treasurer

Locations 
CKS is based in Siem Reap, Cambodia with an office in Phnom Penh and administrative and support offices in the United States.

References

External links 
 Center for Khmer Studies

Research institutes in Cambodia